Tropical storms are tropical cyclones with 1-minute sustained winds between . Tropical cyclones that attain such winds and make landfall while maintaining that intensity are capable of causing minor to moderate damage to human lives and infrastructure. Since 1949, at least 490 systems have peaked at tropical storm intensity in the Eastern Pacific basin, which is denoted as the part of the Pacific Ocean north of the equator and east of the International Date Line. This list does not include storms that also attained Category 1, 2, 3, 4, or 5 status on the Saffir–Simpson scale.

There are a plethora of factors that influence tropical cyclogenesis, the formation of tropical cyclones, in the Northeastern Pacific. The North Pacific High and Aleutian Low which occur from December to April, produce strong upper-level winds which prevent the formation of tropical cyclones. During the summer and early autumn months, sea surface temperatures are generally warm enough to support tropical cyclone development in the Northeast Pacific, and perhaps even rapid intensification. Additionally, El Niño events cause more powerful hurricanes to form by generating weaker wind shear and higher sea surface temperatures, while La Niña events reduce the number of such hurricanes by doing the opposite.

Background

Should a tropical storm make landfall, it has the potential to cause minor to moderate damage to human infrastructure, with debris carried by the winds capable of bringing injury or death to humans and animals.

The Northeast Pacific tropical cyclone basin is defined as the region of the Pacific Ocean north of the equator and east of the International Date Line. The Northeast Pacific is further divided into two sub-basins, namely the east and central Pacific. The east Pacific runs east of the 140th meridian west, and tropical cyclones occurring there are warned upon by the National Hurricane Center, the current Regional Specialized Meteorological Center (RSMC) for that area. The central Pacific, running from the 140th meridian west to the International Date Line, currently has the Central Pacific Hurricane Center as its RSMC. Tropical cyclones are generally much rarer in the central Pacific than in the east Pacific, with an average of just four to five storms forming or moving into the central Pacific compared to around 15 for the east Pacific. All tropical cyclones recorded by past and present RSMCs of the Northeast Pacific basin since 1949 are listed in the Northeast and North Central Pacific hurricane database (HURDAT), which is compiled and maintained by the National Hurricane Center.

Climatology
Exceptions to these rules would be storms that affected humans and as such humans were able to measure or estimate wind speeds or pressure data.
Hurricane season in the Northeast Pacific tropical cyclone basin begins on May 15 in the east Pacific and June 1 in the central Pacific, and ends on November 30. Since 1949, a total of 490 tropical storms have developed in the Northeast Pacific basin.

The formation and development of tropical cyclones, termed tropical cyclogenesis, requires high sea surface temperatures of at least  and low vertical wind shear. When these conditions are met, a pre-existing tropical disturbance – usually a tropical wave – can develop into a tropical cyclone, provided the disturbance is far enough from the Equator to experience a sufficiently strong Coriolis force which is responsible for the counterclockwise rotation of hurricanes in the Northern Hemisphere. During the winter and spring months of December to April, sea surface temperatures in the tropics are usually too low to support development. Also, the presence of a semi-permanent high-pressure area known as the North Pacific High in the eastern Pacific greatly suppresses formation of tropical cyclones in the winter, as the North Pacific High results in vertical wind shear that causes environmental conditions to be unconducive to tropical cyclone formation. Another factor preventing tropical cyclones from forming during the winter is the presence of a semi-permanent low-pressure area called the Aleutian Low between January and April. Its effects in the central Pacific near the 160th meridian west cause tropical waves that form in the area to drift northward into the Gulf of Alaska and dissipate or become extratropical. Its retreat in late-April allows the warmth of the Pacific High to meander in, bringing its powerful clockwise wind circulation with it. The Intertropical Convergence Zone departs southward in mid-May permitting the formation of the earliest tropical waves, coinciding with the start of the eastern Pacific hurricane season on May 15. During summer and autumn, sea surface temperatures rise further to reach near  in July and August, well above the  threshold for tropical cyclogenesis. This allows for hurricanes developing during that time to strengthen significantly.

The El Niño–Southern Oscillation also influences the frequency and intensity of hurricanes in the Northeast Pacific basin. During years with the existence of an El Niño event, sea surface temperatures increase in the Northeast Pacific and average vertical wind shear decreases, resulting in an increase in activity; the opposite happens in the Atlantic basin during El Niño, where increased wind shear creates an unfavorable environment for tropical cyclone formation. Contrary to El Niño, La Niña increases wind shear and decreases sea surface temperatures over the eastern Pacific, while reducing wind shear and increasing sea surface temperatures over the Atlantic.

Within the Northeast Pacific, tropical cyclones generally head west out into the open Pacific Ocean, steered by the westward trade windss. Closer to the end of the season, however, some storms are steered northwards or northeastwards around the subtropical ridge nearer the end of the season, and may bring impacts to the western coasts of Mexico and occasionally even Central America. In the central Pacific basin, the North Pacific High keeps tropical cyclones away from the Hawaiian Islands by forcing them southwards. Combined with cooler waters around the Hawaiian Islands that tend to weaken approaching tropical cyclones, this makes direct impacts on the Hawaiian Islands by tropical cyclones rare.

Systems
Key
 Discontinuous duration (weakened below tropical storm then restrengthened to that classification at least once)
 Intensified past tropical storm intensity after exiting basin

1949–1959

1960–1969

1970–1979

1980–1989

1990–1999

2000–2009

2010–2019

2020–present

Landfalls

See also

 List of Category 1 Pacific hurricanes
 List of Category 2 Pacific hurricanes
 List of Category 3 Pacific hurricanes
 List of Category 4 Pacific hurricanes
 List of Category 5 Pacific hurricanes
 List of Pacific hurricanes
 List of Pacific hurricane seasons

Notes

References

List
Category 0, East
Pacific 0, East